Recreation Ground is a former First-class cricket ground located in Torquay, Devon.

History 
It has been the home of Torquay Cricket Club since 1926. Some sources wrongly attribute matches played at Torquay Cricket Club prior to 1926 to the Recreation Ground, although they were played at Barton Road which was the home of Torquay CC from 1852 to 1925 and is now the home of Barton CC. Between 1954 and 1958, the ground hosted annual fixtures between the South and the North, and between England XI and Commonwealth XI.  The ground has been among the home venues for Devon County Cricket Club since 1932, while first-class county Somerset have also hosted four matches on the ground.  The ground was first used by Torquay Athletic in 1888, but Athletic left twice due to financial disputes before returning for good in 1904. Since 1926 Torquay Athletic RFC have continued as tenants at the ground with cricket being played in the summer months.

The capacity is around 3,000 including 300 in the grandstand.  Initially the grandstand held around 600 but in recent years only half of it is accessible due to safety concerns.

Gallery

References

External links
 Ground Profile at CricketArchive
 Ground Profile at Cricinfo
 Torquay Cricket Club

Devon County Cricket Club
Somerset County Cricket Club
Cricket grounds in Devon
Sport in Torquay
Sports venues completed in 1874
1874 establishments in England